N'Gouri Airport  is a public use airport located near N'Gouri, Lac, Chad.

See also
List of airports in Chad

References

External links 
 Airport record for N'Gouri Airport at Landings.com

Airports in Chad
Lac Region